The 2003–04 Kategoria Superiore was the 68th season of top-tier football in Albania and the first season under the name Kategoria Superiore.

Teams

Stadia and last season

League table

Results
Each team plays every opponent four times, twice at home and twice away, for a total of 36 games.

First half of season

Second half of season

Season statistics

Top goalscorers

Notes

References
Albania - List of final tables (RSSSF)

Kategoria Superiore seasons
1
Albanian Superliga